The 1991 Montreal Expos season was the 23rd season in franchise history. After several winning seasons, the Expos faltered in 1991, winning only 20 of its first 49 games. Manager Buck Rodgers was replaced as manager by Tom Runnells. The team ultimately finished 71-90. The highlight of the season was Dennis Martinez pitching a perfect game at Dodger Stadium on July 28, 1991.

Offseason
 November 15, 1990: Scott Service was signed as a free agent by the Expos.
 December 3, 1990: Rolando Roomes was released by the Montreal Expos.
 December 23, 1990: Tim Raines, Jeff Carter, and a player to be named later were traded by the Expos to the Chicago White Sox for Iván Calderón and Barry Jones. The Expos completed the deal by sending Mario Brito (minors) to the White Sox on February 15, 1991.
 February 15, 1991: Ron Hassey signed as a free agent by the Expos.
 February 27, 1991: Rick Mahler signed as a free agent by the Expos.
 March 30, 1991: Mike Aldrete was released by the Expos.

Spring training
The Expos held spring training at West Palm Beach Municipal Stadium in West Palm Beach, Florida – a facility they shared with the Atlanta Braves. It was their 15th season at the stadium; they had conducted spring training there from 1969 to 1972 and since 1981.

Regular season

On May 23, 1991, the Expos were no-hit by the Phillies' Tommy Greene. Greene was starting for only the second time in the season and 15th time in his major league career, and was pitching in place of Danny Cox who had suffered a pulled groin in his last start. Greene became the first visiting pitcher to hurl a no-hitter in Montreal's history as the Phillies defeated the Expos, 2-0 before an Olympic Stadium crowd of 8,833.

 July 26, 1991: Mark Gardner pitched 9 innings of no-hit baseball against the Los Angeles Dodgers at Dodger Stadium. It was tied at 0-0 in the tenth; however, versatile utility man Lenny Harris singled for the Dodgers breaking it up.
 July 28, 1991: In a 2–0 victory, Dennis Martínez pitched a perfect game against the Los Angeles Dodgers at Dodger Stadium. The final out was recorded by Marquis Grissom in center field off a lazy fly ball off the bat of Chris Gwynn. Dennis shut out the Dodgers in his previous meeting with them on April 30, 1991, the perfect game marked the 25th straight inning the Dodgers failed to score a run off him.
 September 8, 1991: The Expos had to play their last 13 home games on the road, due to a concrete beam from Olympic Stadium's roof collapsing.

Season standings

Record vs. opponents

Opening Day starters
 Oil Can Boyd
 Iván Calderón
 Delino DeShields
 Andrés Galarraga
 Dave Martinez
 Spike Owen
 Gilberto Reyes
 Larry Walker
 Tim Wallach

Notable transactions
 April 1, 1991: Otis Nixon and Boi Rodriguez (minors) were traded by the Expos to the Atlanta Braves for Jimmy Kremers and a player to be named later. The Braves completed the deal by sending Keith Morrison (minors) to the Expos on June 3.
 June 3, 1991: 1991 Major League Baseball Draft
Cliff Floyd was drafted by the Expos in the 1st round (14th pick) ft. Player signed June 15, 1991.
Kirk Rueter was drafted by the Expos in the 18th round. Player signed June 21, 1991.
 June 4, 1991: Kenny Williams was selected off waivers by the Expos from the Toronto Blue Jays.
 June 10, 1991: Rick Mahler was released by the Expos.
 July 15, 1991: Tim Burke was traded by the Expos to the New York Mets for Ron Darling and Mike Thomas.
 July 19, 1991: Scott Service was purchased from the Expos by the Chunichi Dragons.
 July 21, 1991: Oil Can Boyd was traded by the Expos to the Texas Rangers for Jonathan Hurst, Joey Eischen, and a player to be named later. The Rangers completed the deal by sending Travis Buckley (minors) to the Expos on September 1.
 July 31, 1991: Ron Darling was traded by the Expos to the Oakland Athletics for Matt Grott and Russell Cormier (minors).

The Perfect Game
On July 28, 1991, Dennis Martínez became the first Latin-born pitcher to throw a perfect game, the 13th in major league history, against the Los Angeles Dodgers.

Scorecard
July 28, Dodger Stadium, Chávez Ravine, California

Roster

Player stats

Batting

Starters by position
Note: Pos = Position; G = Games played; AB = At bats; H = Hits; Avg. = Batting average; HR = Home runs; RBI = Runs batted in

Other batters
Note: G = Games played; AB = At bats; H = Hits; Avg. = Batting average; HR = Home runs; RBI = Runs batted in

Pitching

Starting pitchers
Note: G = Games pitched; IP = Innings pitched; W = Wins; L = Losses; ERA = Earned run average; SO = Strikeouts

Other pitchers
Note: G = Games pitched; IP = Innings pitched; W = Wins; L = Losses; ERA = Earned run average; SO = Strikeouts

Relief pitchers
Note: G = Games pitched; W = Wins; L = Losses; SV = Saves; ERA = Earned run average; SO = Strikeouts

Award winners
 Marquis Grissom, National League Stolen Base Leader, 76 
 Dennis Martínez, National League ERA Champion, 2.39
 Dennis Martínez, Pitcher of the Month, July

All-Stars 
1991 Major League Baseball All-Star Game
 Iván Calderón, outfield, starter
 Dennis Martínez, reserve

Farm system

LEAGUE CHAMPIONS: West Palm Beach, Jamestown, GCL Expos

References

External links
 1991 Montreal Expos team page at Baseball Reference
 1991 Montreal Expos team page at www.baseball-almanac.com
 

Montreal Expos seasons
Montreal Expos season
1990s in Montreal
1991 in Quebec